"It's OK" is the second single from American soul singer CeeLo Green's third studio album, The Lady Killer. The song is produced by Element, and written by Cee Lo, Element and Noel Fisher. The single was released on December 27, 2010 and peaked at number 20 on the UK Singles Chart. In the UK the single made BBC Radio 1's A-Playlist (which is argued to be its "most influential playlist").

Background
Unlike the first single from the album, "It's OK" was exclusively released in the UK and certain areas of Europe. The song received its first recognition on the British charts following the video premiering on 4 Music on December 9, 2010. The single was released on two formats only: the physical release, which features the main album version and the Paul Epworth remix of the title track; and the digital release, which includes two remixes of the title track, exclusive B-Side "Bridges" and a live recording of "Radioactive" taken from the Radio 1 Live Lounge Sessions.

Critical reception
In the context of The Lady Killer, the song was positively reviewed. David Carr for Chicks With Guns (CWG) Magazine says, "On the more up tempo numbers [on The Lady Killer], "Cry Baby, [and] It's OK", you may feel as if you are watching reruns of the 70’s TV show Love American Style as Cee Lo creates some great lyrical vignettes to go with his amazingly versatile voice. Don’t even think of asking if the man uses auto-tune because the answer is a resounding no!" Leah Greenblatt for Entertainment Weekly says, "[It's OK] honors and tweaks the tropes of vintage songcraft with hefty doses of sweet Motown/Stax boogie." Andy Gill for The Belfast Telegraph argues, "when [Green] pushes the Motown buttons again, as in "Cry Baby", and "It's OK", it's done with such panache and wit that staleness never becomes an issue: rather than just footnotes to the source inspiration, these are fully rounded artworks in their own right." Colin Somerville of Scotland on Sunday describes It's OK as a "luxuriant stomp" with a "Northern Soul" influence, and lists it in his tracks to download from The Lady Killer.

Not all reviews of "It's OK" were positive, however. Robin Murray for Clash Magazine (reviewing It's OK as a single release) opines, "blessed with an undoubtedly pleasant voice, it’s a shame that Cee Lo Green uses it on such undramatic material. Sure, ‘Forget You’ had its cheeky charm but you can’t help but feel that Cee Lo could do so much more. ‘It’s OK’ is another pleasant, melodic single which will be adopted by the nation but the middle of the road is such a boring way to travel."

Commercial performance 
After its December 27, 2010 release, "It's OK" entered the UK Singles Chart at No. 44, and in its fourth week rose to No. 24. In its fifth week on the UK Singles Chart, the song peaked at No. 20. In the subsequent week, the song dropped to No. 33. The song entered the UK R&B charts at No. 54 a week before its release, and upon its release it climbed to No. 20. The song rose to No. 17 in its second week, No. 14 in its third week, and subsequently peaked at No. 6 in its fourth week. The song peaked at No. 94 on the Dutch charts. Entering at No. 30, "It's OK" eventually peaked at No. 17 on the Belgian airplay chart. In its fourth week on the Scottish Charts, the song rose to No. 23 from its previous week's position at No. 43. In its fifth week on the Scottish Charts the song peaked at No. 19, and fell to No. 36 in its subsequent week. The song did not chart in the United States.

Music video
The music video for "It's OK" was released to YouTube on December 2, 2010, and features Solange Knowles. Gil Kaufman published this summary of the video for MTV.com:

Live performances 
Cee Lo is touring with an all-female backing band named Scarlet Fever, performing this song on
November 11, 2010, as part of the Symmetry Live Concert Series at the W Hotel in Midtown Manhattan, New York,
February 25, 2011, for Shockwaves NME Awards Big Gig opening for Foo Fighters at Wembley Arena,
and throughout their 2011 concert tours.
Cee Lo also appeared on the latest series of Alan Carr: Chatty Man to promote the single.

Track listing

 Digital Download
 "It's OK" (Album Version) - 3:46
 "It's OK" (Paul Epworth Version) - 3:31
 "It's OK" (Michael Gray Remix) - 7:06
 "Bridges" (Produced By The Neptunes)
 "Radioactive" (BBC Live Version) - 3:24

 Promotional CD Single
 "It's OK" (Paul Epworth Version) - 3:31
 "It's OK" (Album Version) - 3:46

Personnel
Songwriting - Cee Lo Green, Hitesh Ceon, Kim Ofstad, Noel Fisher
Recording - [At Elementary Studios, Oslo, Norway] - Hitesh, Kim
Recording [At Pre Productions Studios] - Mark Rankin
Production - Element*
Production (co-production) - Paul Epworth
Engineering - [Engineered At Metropolis Studios, London, England] - Dan Parry*
Management [Element] - Danny D, Tim Blacksmith
Mixing - Tom Elmhirst
Backing Vocals - Philip Lawrence*
Performers [instruments] - Hitesh Ceon, Jacob Lutrell, Jerry Wonder, Kim Ofstad, Mike Caren, Nikolaj Torp Larsen, Paul Epworth
Source:

Charts

Release history

References

2010 singles
CeeLo Green songs
Songs written by CeeLo Green
Songs written by Detail (record producer)
2010 songs
Elektra Records singles
Songs written by Kim Ofstad
Songs written by Hitesh Ceon